The 2013–14 Liga I is the ninety-sixth season of Liga I, the top-level football league of Romania. The season began on 19 July 2013 and ended on 21 May 2014. Steaua București are the defending champions.

Since Romania climbed from 22nd to 18th place in the UEFA association coefficient rankings at the end of the 2012–13 season, the winners of the 2013–14 Cupa României will start in the third qualifying round of the Europa League instead of second qualifying round. The champions will still enter the second qualifying round of the 2014–15 UEFA Champions League, the second-placed team will still enter the second qualifying round of the 2014–15 UEFA Europa League, but third-placed team will enter the second qualifying round instead of first qualifying round.

Teams
The last four teams from the 2012–13 season were initially relegated to their respective 2013–14 Liga II division. Gloria Bistrița, Turnu Severin and CSM Studențesc Iași were relegated after just one season in the top flight, while Concordia Chiajna were to return to Liga II after two years.

Additionally, two other teams were also relegated because they failed to obtain a licence for the 2013–14 Liga I season: Rapid București and Universitatea Cluj. However, on 5 July 2013, the International Court of Arbitration for Sport upheld the appeal of Universitatea Cluj and therefore decided that they could remain in Liga I. Also, the Romanian Football Federation announced a play-off game between Rapid Bucharest and Concordia Chiajna for the 18th place in the 2013–14 season. The play-off was played on 13 July 2013 and won by Rapid, with 2–1, after extra-time. The FRF decision was contested by Concordia at the CAS. On 2 August, CAS decided that Concordia Chiajna should play in Liga I and Rapid was relegated to the second division. The results of the matches played by Rapid in the first two rounds of the season, with Viitorul and Vaslui, were canceled.

The first two teams from each of the two divisions of 2012–13 Liga II advanced to Liga I. FC Botoșani promoted as the winners of Seria I. It is their first season in Liga I and the first time ever a team from Botoșani County is playing in the first league. The other three teams are also for the first time in Liga I: Săgeata Năvodari, second place in Seria I, Corona Brașov and Poli Timișoara from Seria II. While ACS Poli Timișoara is considered to be the successor of FC Politehnica Timișoara, the club was formed by moving ACS Recaș to Timișoara in the summer of 2012.

This is the first season since 1952 with only two teams from Bucharest.

Season incidents
Between the rounds 10 and 14, FC Vaslui was penalized with an eight points deduction because of debts owed to agent Codoban Tătar Ionel. The decision was reverted by the Appeal commission of the Romanian Football Federation on 8 November 2013.

Venues

Personnel and kits

Note: Flags indicate national team as has been defined under FIFA eligibility rules. Players and Managers may hold more than one non-FIFA nationality.

Managerial changes

League table

Results

Top goalscorers

Last updated: 19 April 2014
1 Eric was transferred to Al-Ahli during the winter transfer window.

Champion squad

Statistics

Scoring
First goal of the season:  Szabolcs Székely (Poli) against Dinamo
Hat-tricks of the season:
 Constantin Budescu (Astra) against Viitorul (stage 1)
 Derick Ogbu (CFR) against Oțelul (stage 10)
Fastest goal of the season:  Constantin Budescu (Astra) against Dinamo (15 seconds)

Awards

Monthly awards

References

External links
 League table and recent results at Soccerway
 Official website

2013-14
Rom
1